Pumora is a monotypic moth genus of the family Noctuidae. Its only species, Pumora hyperion, is found in Mexico. Both the genus and species were first described by Harrison Gray Dyar Jr. in 1918.

References

Acronictinae
Monotypic moth genera